Magic Maize  is a children's novella written and illustrated by Mary and Conrad Buff. Set in contemporary Guatemala, it describes the life and adventures of a boy from a traditional Mayan Indian family. First published in 1953, it was a Newbery Honor recipient in 1954.

References

1953 American novels
American children's novels
Newbery Honor-winning works
Novels set in Guatemala
Houghton Mifflin books
1953 children's books
Children's novellas